The 1908 VFL season was the twelfth season of the Victorian Football League (VFL), the highest level senior Australian rules football competition in Victoria.

The season ran from 2 May until 26 September, and comprised an 18-game home-and-away season followed by a finals series featuring the top four clubs.

The premiership was won by the Carlton Football Club for the third time and third time consecutively, after it defeated  by nine points in the 1908 VFL Grand Final.

Premiership season
In 1908, the VFL competition consisted of ten teams of 18 on-the-field players each, with no "reserves", although any of the 18 players who had left the playing field for any reason could later resume their place on the field at any time during the match.

Each team played each other twice in a home-and-away season of 18 rounds.

Once the 18 round home-and-away season had finished, the 1908 VFL Premiers were determined by the specific format and conventions of the amended "Argus system".

Round 1

|- bgcolor="#CCCCFF"
| Home team
| Home team score
| Away team
| Away team score
| Venue
| Date
|- bgcolor="#FFFFFF"
| 
| 6.8 (44)
| 
| 7.11 (53)
| Brunswick Street Oval
| 2 May 1908
|- bgcolor="#FFFFFF"
| 
| 14.11 (95)
| 
| 3.11 (29)
| EMCG
| 2 May 1908
|- bgcolor="#FFFFFF"
| 
| 6.12 (48)
| 
| 3.4 (22)
| Princes Park
| 2 May 1908
|- bgcolor="#FFFFFF"
| 
| 8.14 (62)
| 
| 7.9 (51)
| Punt Road Oval
| 2 May 1908
|- bgcolor="#FFFFFF"
| 
| 12.13 (85)
| 
| 5.8 (38)
| Corio Oval
| 2 May 1908

Round 2

|- bgcolor="#CCCCFF"
| Home team
| Home team score
| Away team
| Away team score
| Venue
| Date
|- bgcolor="#FFFFFF"
| 
| 3.14 (32)
| 
| 9.9 (63)
| Victoria Park
| 9 May 1908
|- bgcolor="#FFFFFF"
| 
| 14.10 (94)
| 
| 12.4 (76)
| EMCG
| 9 May 1908
|- bgcolor="#FFFFFF"
| 
| 7.9 (51)
| 
| 4.8 (32)
| Lake Oval
| 9 May 1908
|- bgcolor="#FFFFFF"
| 
| 7.6 (48)
| 
| 12.14 (86)
| Junction Oval
| 9 May 1908
|- bgcolor="#FFFFFF"
| 
| 6.8 (44)
| 
| 9.8 (62)
| MCG
| 9 May 1908

Round 3

|- bgcolor="#CCCCFF"
| Home team
| Home team score
| Away team
| Away team score
| Venue
| Date
|- bgcolor="#FFFFFF"
| 
| 7.8 (50)
| 
| 10.12 (72)
| Corio Oval
| 16 May 1908
|- bgcolor="#FFFFFF"
| 
| 5.13 (43)
| 
| 4.8 (32)
| Princes Park
| 16 May 1908
|- bgcolor="#FFFFFF"
| 
| 4.2 (26)
| 
| 7.13 (55)
| Lake Oval
| 16 May 1908
|- bgcolor="#FFFFFF"
| 
| 7.13 (55)
| 
| 11.14 (80)
| Punt Road Oval
| 16 May 1908
|- bgcolor="#FFFFFF"
| 
| 7.12 (54)
| 
| 8.14 (62)
| EMCG
| 16 May 1908

Round 4

|- bgcolor="#CCCCFF"
| Home team
| Home team score
| Away team
| Away team score
| Venue
| Date
|- bgcolor="#FFFFFF"
| 
| 5.10 (40)
| 
| 8.6 (54)
| Junction Oval
| 23 May 1908
|- bgcolor="#FFFFFF"
| 
| 12.3 (75)
| 
| 10.13 (73)
| MCG
| 23 May 1908
|- bgcolor="#FFFFFF"
| 
| 7.18 (60)
| 
| 6.8 (44)
| Brunswick Street Oval
| 23 May 1908
|- bgcolor="#FFFFFF"
| 
| 11.16 (82)
| 
| 6.9 (45)
| EMCG
| 23 May 1908
|- bgcolor="#FFFFFF"
| 
| 5.9 (39)
| 
| 10.7 (67)
| Victoria Park
| 23 May 1908

Round 5

|- bgcolor="#CCCCFF"
| Home team
| Home team score
| Away team
| Away team score
| Venue
| Date
|- bgcolor="#FFFFFF"
| 
| 12.4 (76)
| 
| 9.11 (65)
| Lake Oval
| 30 May 1908
|- bgcolor="#FFFFFF"
| 
| 10.12 (72)
| 
| 5.10 (40)
| Princes Park
| 30 May 1908
|- bgcolor="#FFFFFF"
| 
| 9.12 (66)
| 
| 2.13 (25)
| Junction Oval
| 30 May 1908
|- bgcolor="#FFFFFF"
| 
| 8.17 (65)
| 
| 8.11 (59)
| Punt Road Oval
| 30 May 1908
|- bgcolor="#FFFFFF"
| 
| 10.9 (69)
| 
| 9.10 (64)
| EMCG
| 30 May 1908

Round 6

|- bgcolor="#CCCCFF"
| Home team
| Home team score
| Away team
| Away team score
| Venue
| Date
|- bgcolor="#FFFFFF"
| 
| 5.9 (39)
| 
| 6.6 (42)
| Corio Oval
| 6 June 1908
|- bgcolor="#FFFFFF"
| 
| 12.7 (79)
| 
| 9.10 (64)
| Victoria Park
| 6 June 1908
|- bgcolor="#FFFFFF"
| 
| 12.7 (79)
| 
| 1.13 (19)
| EMCG
| 6 June 1908
|- bgcolor="#FFFFFF"
| 
| 5.8 (38)
| 
| 5.12 (42)
| Brunswick Street Oval
| 6 June 1908
|- bgcolor="#FFFFFF"
| 
| 7.9 (51)
| 
| 8.5 (53)
| Lake Oval
| 6 June 1908

Round 7

|- bgcolor="#CCCCFF"
| Home team
| Home team score
| Away team
| Away team score
| Venue
| Date
|- bgcolor="#FFFFFF"
| 
| 9.9 (63)
| 
| 11.11 (77)
| Punt Road Oval
| 8 June 1908
|- bgcolor="#FFFFFF"
| 
| 13.14 (92)
| 
| 2.13 (25)
| Princes Park
| 8 June 1908
|- bgcolor="#FFFFFF"
| 
| 9.7 (61)
| 
| 12.12 (84)
| EMCG
| 8 June 1908
|- bgcolor="#FFFFFF"
| 
| 10.6 (66)
| 
| 10.12 (72)
| MCG
| 8 June 1908
|- bgcolor="#FFFFFF"
| 
| 12.11 (83)
| 
| 5.12 (42)
| Junction Oval
| 8 June 1908

Round 8

|- bgcolor="#CCCCFF"
| Home team
| Home team score
| Away team
| Away team score
| Venue
| Date
|- bgcolor="#FFFFFF"
| 
| 4.11 (35)
| 
| 5.9 (39)
| Corio Oval
| 13 June 1908
|- bgcolor="#FFFFFF"
| 
| 7.6 (48)
| 
| 12.9 (81)
| Brunswick Street Oval
| 13 June 1908
|- bgcolor="#FFFFFF"
| 
| 8.11 (59)
| 
| 6.9 (45)
| EMCG
| 13 June 1908
|- bgcolor="#FFFFFF"
| 
| 8.8 (56)
| 
| 4.8 (32)
| Victoria Park
| 13 June 1908
|- bgcolor="#FFFFFF"
| 
| 17.13 (115)
| 
| 2.15 (27)
| Princes Park
| 13 June 1908

Round 9

|- bgcolor="#CCCCFF"
| Home team
| Home team score
| Away team
| Away team score
| Venue
| Date
|- bgcolor="#FFFFFF"
| 
| 9.5 (59)
| 
| 3.15 (33)
| Junction Oval
| 20 June 1908
|- bgcolor="#FFFFFF"
| 
| 4.4 (28)
| 
| 3.7 (25)
| MCG
| 20 June 1908
|- bgcolor="#FFFFFF"
| 
| 3.7 (25)
| 
| 7.9 (51)
| Corio Oval
| 20 June 1908
|- bgcolor="#FFFFFF"
| 
| 9.11 (65)
| 
| 6.8 (44)
| Lake Oval
| 20 June 1908
|- bgcolor="#FFFFFF"
| 
| 6.15 (51)
| 
| 7.15 (57)
| EMCG
| 20 June 1908

Round 10

|- bgcolor="#CCCCFF"
| Home team
| Home team score
| Away team
| Away team score
| Venue
| Date
|- bgcolor="#FFFFFF"
| 
| 11.16 (82)
| 
| 1.6 (12)
| MCG
| 27 June 1908
|- bgcolor="#FFFFFF"
| 
| 9.12 (66)
| 
| 7.4 (46)
| Victoria Park
| 27 June 1908
|- bgcolor="#FFFFFF"
| 
| 2.19 (31)
| 
| 2.6 (18)
| Lake Oval
| 27 June 1908
|- bgcolor="#FFFFFF"
| 
| 6.10 (46)
| 
| 7.14 (56)
| EMCG
| 27 June 1908
|- bgcolor="#FFFFFF"
| 
| 6.5 (41)
| 
| 10.12 (72)
| Junction Oval
| 27 June 1908

Round 11

|- bgcolor="#CCCCFF"
| Home team
| Home team score
| Away team
| Away team score
| Venue
| Date
|- bgcolor="#FFFFFF"
| 
| 11.5 (71)
| 
| 8.14 (62)
| Punt Road Oval
| 4 July 1908
|- bgcolor="#FFFFFF"
| 
| 9.4 (58)
| 
| 9.12 (66)
| Corio Oval
| 4 July 1908
|- bgcolor="#FFFFFF"
| 
| 5.10 (40)
| 
| 8.9 (57)
| EMCG
| 4 July 1908
|- bgcolor="#FFFFFF"
| 
| 8.15 (63)
| 
| 4.7 (31)
| Princes Park
| 4 July 1908
|- bgcolor="#FFFFFF"
| 
| 6.6 (42)
| 
| 7.2 (44)
| Brunswick Street Oval
| 4 July 1908

Round 12

|- bgcolor="#CCCCFF"
| Home team
| Home team score
| Away team
| Away team score
| Venue
| Date
|- bgcolor="#FFFFFF"
| 
| 5.4 (34)
| 
| 4.5 (29)
| Junction Oval
| 11 July 1908
|- bgcolor="#FFFFFF"
| 
| 4.9 (33)
| 
| 5.4 (34)
| Brunswick Street Oval
| 11 July 1908
|- bgcolor="#FFFFFF"
| 
| 3.13 (31)
| 
| 2.2 (14)
| Victoria Park
| 11 July 1908
|- bgcolor="#FFFFFF"
| 
| 9.12 (66)
| 
| 7.6 (48)
| MCG
| 11 July 1908
|- bgcolor="#FFFFFF"
| 
| 6.6 (42)
| 
| 4.5 (29)
| EMCG
| 11 July 1908

Round 13

|- bgcolor="#CCCCFF"
| Home team
| Home team score
| Away team
| Away team score
| Venue
| Date
|- bgcolor="#FFFFFF"
| 
| 10.17 (77)
| 
| 5.7 (37)
| Princes Park
| 18 July 1908
|- bgcolor="#FFFFFF"
| 
| 7.14 (56)
| 
| 5.13 (43)
| EMCG
| 18 July 1908
|- bgcolor="#FFFFFF"
| 
| 5.10 (40)
| 
| 11.8 (74)
| Lake Oval
| 18 July 1908
|- bgcolor="#FFFFFF"
| 
| 7.14 (56)
| 
| 11.8 (74)
| Corio Oval
| 18 July 1908
|- bgcolor="#FFFFFF"
| 
| 7.3 (45)
| 
| 9.14 (68)
| Punt Road Oval
| 18 July 1908

Round 14

|- bgcolor="#CCCCFF"
| Home team
| Home team score
| Away team
| Away team score
| Venue
| Date
|- bgcolor="#FFFFFF"
| 
| 16.11 (107)
| 
| 8.3 (51)
| MCG
| 25 July 1908
|- bgcolor="#FFFFFF"
| 
| 6.17 (53)
| 
| 5.8 (38)
| Corio Oval
| 25 July 1908
|- bgcolor="#FFFFFF"
| 
| 8.12 (60)
| 
| 8.8 (56)
| Victoria Park
| 25 July 1908
|- bgcolor="#FFFFFF"
| 
| 11.7 (73)
| 
| 10.11 (71)
| EMCG
| 25 July 1908
|- bgcolor="#FFFFFF"
| 
| 4.9 (33)
| 
| 6.8 (44)
| Brunswick Street Oval
| 25 July 1908

Round 15

|- bgcolor="#CCCCFF"
| Home team
| Home team score
| Away team
| Away team score
| Venue
| Date
|- bgcolor="#FFFFFF"
| 
| 7.12 (54)
| 
| 8.10 (58)
| MCG
| 1 August 1908
|- bgcolor="#FFFFFF"
| 
| 8.13 (61)
| 
| 7.8 (50)
| EMCG
| 1 August 1908
|- bgcolor="#FFFFFF"
| 
| 8.19 (67)
| 
| 6.5 (41)
| Princes Park
| 1 August 1908
|- bgcolor="#FFFFFF"
| 
| 17.5 (107)
| 
| 5.8 (38)
| Junction Oval
| 1 August 1908
|- bgcolor="#FFFFFF"
| 
| 11.8 (74)
| 
| 10.9 (69)
| Punt Road Oval
| 1 August 1908

Round 16

|- bgcolor="#CCCCFF"
| Home team
| Home team score
| Away team
| Away team score
| Venue
| Date
|- bgcolor="#FFFFFF"
| 
| 13.16 (94)
| 
| 11.7 (73)
| Brunswick Street Oval
| 8 August 1908
|- bgcolor="#FFFFFF"
| 
| 17.17 (119)
| 
| 8.11 (59)
| EMCG
| 8 August 1908
|- bgcolor="#FFFFFF"
| 
| 10.10 (70)
| 
| 7.9 (51)
| Victoria Park
| 8 August 1908
|- bgcolor="#FFFFFF"
| 
| 18.12 (120)
| 
| 4.4 (28)
| Lake Oval
| 8 August 1908
|- bgcolor="#FFFFFF"
| 
| 5.9 (39)
| 
| 6.13 (49)
| Corio Oval
| 8 August 1908

Round 17

|- bgcolor="#CCCCFF"
| Home team
| Home team score
| Away team
| Away team score
| Venue
| Date
|- bgcolor="#FFFFFF"
| 
| 13.18 (96)
| 
| 6.8 (44)
| EMCG
| 15 August 1908
|- bgcolor="#FFFFFF"
| 
| 4.7 (31)
| 
| 3.4 (22)
| Junction Oval
| 15 August 1908
|- bgcolor="#FFFFFF"
| 
| 5.8 (38)
| 
| 3.14 (32)
| Lake Oval
| 15 August 1908
|- bgcolor="#FFFFFF"
| 
| 4.8 (32)
| 
| 6.9 (45)
| MCG
| 15 August 1908
|- bgcolor="#FFFFFF"
| 
| 4.17 (41)
| 
| 6.12 (48)
| Punt Road Oval
| 15 August 1908

Round 18

|- bgcolor="#CCCCFF"
| Home team
| Home team score
| Away team
| Away team score
| Venue
| Date
|- bgcolor="#FFFFFF"
| 
| 16.11 (107)
| 
| 6.8 (44)
| Punt Road Oval
| 5 September 1908
|- bgcolor="#FFFFFF"
| 
| 11.18 (84)
| 
| 1.4 (10)
| Brunswick Street Oval
| 5 September 1908
|- bgcolor="#FFFFFF"
| 
| 13.20 (98)
| 
| 3.9 (27)
| EMCG
| 5 September 1908
|- bgcolor="#FFFFFF"
| 
| 12.16 (88)
| 
| 3.4 (22)
| Victoria Park
| 5 September 1908
|- bgcolor="#FFFFFF"
| 
| 10.7 (67)
| 
| 4.4 (28)
| Princes Park
| 5 September 1908

Ladder

Semi finals

First Semi Final

|- bgcolor="#CCCCFF"
| Home team
| Home team score
| Away team
| Away team score
| Venue
| Date
|  
|- bgcolor="#FFFFFF"
| 
| 9.14 (68)
| 
| 5.3 (33)
| MCG
| 12 September 1908
| Attendance: 24,700
|- bgcolor="#FFFFFF"

Second Semi Final

|- bgcolor="#CCCCFF"
| Home team
| Home team score
| Away team
| Away team score
| Venue
| Date
|  
|- bgcolor="#FFFFFF"
| 
| 12.12 (84)
| 
| 3.8 (26)
| MCG
| 19 September 1908
| Attendance: 26,100
|- bgcolor="#FFFFFF"

Grand final

Carlton defeated Essendon 5.5 (35) to 3.8 (26). (For an explanation of scoring see Australian rules football).

Awards
 The 1908 VFL Premiership team was Carlton.
 The VFL's leading goalkicker was Dick Lee of Collingwood with 54 goals.
 Geelong took the "wooden spoon" in 1908.

Notable events
 Richmond Football Club and University Football Club  were admitted to the VFL competition.
 With fiery former Collingwood coach Dick Condon as playing coach and former Collingwood champion Charlie Pannam as captain, Richmond won its first VFL match against Melbourne, 8.14 (62) to 7.9 (51). University had its first VFL victory in the second round of the season, beating Richmond 14.10 (94) to 12.4 (76).
 In the first round match between Fitzroy and South Melbourne at the Brunswick Street Oval, an umpire was hit by a stone thrown by a spectator.
 The sixth round match between Fitzroy and Essendon, also at the Brunswick Street Oval, was a fiery affair that resulted in a number of suspensions. A horde of Fitzroy supporters invaded the ground immediately the final bell had rung, kicking, punching and otherwise assaulting Essendon players as they tried to leave the playing field. Essendon fans also jumped the fence, in order to protect their players. A riot ensued.
 A ten-day Carnival, the "Jubilee of Australasian Football (1858–1908)" was held in Melbourne in August 1908, involving teams from New South Wales, New Zealand, Queensland, South Australia, Tasmania, Victoria, and Western Australia.
 At an official Carnival function, when proposing a toast to "The Australasian Game" the Prime Minister of Australia, the Melbourne-born Alfred Deakin (1856–1919) spoke of his youthful experiences of playing a rudimentary form of Australian football.

See also
1908 Melbourne Carnival
1908 VFL Grand Final

References

 Hogan, P., The Tigers Of Old, The Richmond Football Club, (Richmond), 1996. 
 Maplestone, M., Flying Higher: History of the Essendon Football Club 1872–1996, Essendon Football Club, (Melbourne), 1996. 
 Rogers, S. & Brown, A., Every Game Ever Played: VFL/AFL Results 1897–1997 (Sixth Edition), Viking Books, (Ringwood), 1998. 
 Ross, J. (ed), 100 Years of Australian Football 1897–1996: The Complete Story of the AFL, All the Big Stories, All the Great Pictures, All the Champions, Every AFL Season Reported, Viking, (Ringwood), 1996.

External links
 1908 Season - AFL Tables
  Article on 1908 Melbourne Carnival at AustralianFootball.com

Australian Football League seasons
VFL season